Anxhelo Mumajesi (born 25 March 1997) is an Albanian professional footballer who plays as an attacking midfielder for German club SC Hessen Dreieich and the Albania national under-21 football team.

Club career

Early career
Mumajesi started his youth career with KF Tirana in 2011.

In the start of 2016 Mumajesi was promoted in the first team of KF Tirana by coach Ilir Daja.

Kamza
In August 2017 he signed a 3-years contract with FC Kamza becoming the 9th arrival in the just promoted Albanian Superliga team.

Hessen Dreieich
On 11 September 2019 German Hessenliga club SC Hessen Dreieich confirmed, that Mumajesi had joined the club on a contract for the 2019-20 season.

International career
Mumajesi received his first international call up at the Albania national under-21 football team by coach Alban Bushi for a gathering between 14–17 May 2017 with most of the players selected from Albanian championships.

He received his first call up for the Albania under-20 side by coach Alban Bushi for the double friendly match against Azerbaijan U-21 on 21 & 26 January 2018.

Career statistics

Club

References

External links
Anxhelo Mumajesi profile FSHF.org

1997 births
Living people
Footballers from Tirana
Albanian footballers
Albanian expatriate footballers
Association football midfielders
Albania youth international footballers
Albania under-21 international footballers
KF Tirana players
KS Sopoti Librazhd players
FC Kamza players
SC Hessen Dreieich players
Kategoria Superiore players
Kategoria e Parë players
Albanian expatriate sportspeople in Germany
Expatriate footballers in Germany